Simon (died 1225 x 1235) was a 13th-century Augustinian canon based in the Kingdom of Scotland.

As a canon of St Andrews Cathedral Priory, he was elected prior of St Andrews in either 1211 or 1212. Simon, like his predecessor Thomas, was said by Inchcolm historian Walter Bower to have fallen out with the brothers of St Andrews and consequently to have resigned his post as prior. Subsequently, Simon became Prior of Loch Leven. This probably happened c. 1225.

St Serf's Inch Priory lay on St Serf's Inch, an island in Loch Leven in Fothriff, and was subordinate to St Andrews Cathedral Priory.

It is unclear how long Simon lived afterward, but his successor appears in the sources for the first time in 1235, indicating that Simon probably died before this year. Bower described Simon as "a man of honourable life and praiseworthy behaviour".

Notes

References

 
 
 

12th-century births
13th-century deaths
Priors of Loch Leven
Priors of St Andrews
13th-century Scottish Roman Catholic priests